Dolly Jørgensen is Professor of History at University of Stavanger, Norway and co-editor in Chief of Environmental Humanities. She served as president of the European Society for Environmental History, 2013–2017. Her research ranges from medieval to contemporary environmental issues, approached through environmental history, history of technology, and environmental humanities perspectives. Her primary areas of interest are human-animal relations, the urban environment, and environmental policymaking. Her research has been covered in media such as The New Yorker  and Bioscience. She holds a PhD in History from University of Virginia (2008), a MA in history from University of Houston (2003), and a BA in Civil Engineering from Texas A&M University (1994).

Published works

 Recovering Lost Species in the Modern Age: Histories of Longing and Belonging, MIT Press, 2020. 
 Silver Linings: Clouds in Art and Science, co-edited with Finn Arne Jørgensen, Museumsforlaget, 2020. 
 Visions of North in Premodern Europe, co-edited with Virginia Langum, Brepols, 2018. 
 New Natures: Joining Environmental History with Science and Technology Studies, co-edited with Finn Arne Jørgensen and Sara B. Pritchard, University of Pittsburgh Press, 2013.
 Northscapes: History, Technology, and the Making of Northern Environments, co-edited with Sverker Sörlin, University of British Columbia Press, 2013.

References

External links
 Dolly Jørgensen's employee page, University of Stavanger
 Dolly Jørgensen's web page

Environmental historians
Living people
Texas A&M University alumni
Academic staff of the University of Stavanger
University of Virginia alumni
University of Houston alumni
Year of birth missing (living people)